

December

November

October

September

August

July

June

May

April

March

February

January (post-inauguration)

January (pre-inauguration)

References

External links 
 President Trump: Job Ratings. PollingReport.com
 NBC News/The Wall Street Journal poll archive. The Wall Street Journal.
 CBS News poll archive. CBS News.
 Fox News poll archive. Fox News.
 The Washington Post poll archive. The Washington Post.
 Monmouth University poll archive. Monmouth University.
 Quinnipiac University poll archive. Quinnipiac University.
 Marist College poll archive . Marist College.
 Kaiser Family Foundation poll archive. Kaiser Family Foundation.
 Investor's Business Daily poll archive. Investor's Business Daily.
 Donald Trump Presidential Approval. Roper Center for Public Opinion Research.

Opinion polling
Opinion polling in the United States